Maulvi Nazir Ahmad Dehlvi, also known as Deputy Nazir Ahmad, was an Urdu novel writer, social and religious reformer, and orator.

Even if today’s he’s best known for his novels, he wrote over 30 books on subjects such as law, logic, ethics and linguistics.

His famous novels are Mirat-ul-Uroos  Tobat-un-Nasuh and Ibn-ul-waqt.

He also translated the Qur’an into Urdu.

Early life and upbringing 
Nazir Ahmad was born in 1831 to a family of scholars in Rehar, Bijnor District, U.P., India. His father, Saadat Ali Khan, was a teacher at a religious seminary, madrassa. Until the age of nine, he was home-schooled in Persian and Arabic. He then studied Arabic grammar for five years under the guidance of Deputy Collector Bajnor, Nasrallah Saheb.

To further Ahmad's Arabic skills, in 1842 his father took him to Delhi to study under the guidance of Abd ul-Khaliq at the Aurangabadi Mosque. Ahmad's family was greatly opposed to sending boys to educational institutions running on western lines and urged that education should be confined within the walls of the mosque. However, on a visit to Delhi College, he was offered a scholarship to complete his studies at the college. He took advantage of the opportunity and enrolled in the college in 1846. However,, he enrolled in the Urdu section of the college, as his father had said to him, “he would rather see him (Ahmad) die than learn English”. From 1846 to 1853 at Delhi College, he studied under the famous Arabic scholar Mamluk Ali Nanautawi and the English principal Mr. Taylor, receiving regular education of Arabic literature, philosophy, math and English.

During his time at the mosque at Delhi, Ahmad also discreetly arranged his own marriage to Maulvi Abd ul-Khaliq's granddaughter. Student living in the mosque helped the Maulvi Sahab with daily chores. Ahmad had to carry in his lap a little girl, who became his wife as he grew up, as his teacher was fond of his hard-working habits and good character. He had one son and two daughters from the marriage. His son, Bashiruddin Ahmad Dehlvi, was a high-ranking official, whose own son, Shahid Ahmed Dehlvi, was a famous writer in Pakistan.

Life after Delhi College 
Upon completion of his education, in 1853, Ahmad joined the British colonial administration. He began his life as a school teacher, teaching Arabic in a small school at Kunjah, in Gujarat district, in Punjab. After serving two years in Kunjah, he was appointed as deputy inspector of schools in Cawnpore, but his work there was affected by the mutiny of 1857. At the outbreak of the mutiny he rejoined his family back in Delhi. There, he witnessed the ugly experience of the year of the war.

Over time his English improved enough that he could translate English text into Urdu. The first time his acumen at translation was put to test when upon the desire of Lieutenant Governor Sir William Muir of North Western Provinces, Ahmad translated the Income Tax Act from English to Urdu. Later a board was convened to carry out the translation of the Indian penal code to Urdu. Ahmad was an important member of board and carried out a chunk of the translation himself.

In recognition for his hard work and ability, the colonial government decided to give him an appointment in the revenue department, in which he first worked as a Tehsildar, and then in 1863, as a Deputy Collector.  

Ahmad garnered more acclaim from his story books. As his daughters were growing up, he realized that there were no good Urdu books focused on the education of girls. He began writing a story for his daughters. The way he in ‘true to life’ manner described the ‘house of the family’ and the ‘talks between the members of the family’ captured the fascination of his girls. The girls kept pressing him to write more and more of the story. The fame of his stories spread in the neighborhood, and copies of the manuscripts were made and other girls read own their own.

Initially, Ahmad wrote without any thought of publication. His writings were initially limited to a small social circle. It was the chance discovery of these stories by Mathew Kempson, the British Director of Public Instruction, on his visit to Jhansi where Ahmad was serving, that led to book being published. It was published under the name Mirat-ul-Urus, “Bride’s Mirror”, in 1869.

Mirat ul Urus won huge acclaim upon being published. When Sir William Muir, who knew Ahmad from before, saw the book, he was quite impressed by it. Two months after Kempson's visit to Jhansi, where he came across Ahmad's writing, he sent Ahmad a letter telling how his book was ‘first of its kind’ and was awarded a cash prize of 1000 rupees. At a Darbar held in Agra in 1869, Sir Williams publicly praised the book. He also gave the author a clock as personal present with the author's name inscribed on it.

Life after retirement 

On his return to Delhi, Ahmad undertook the task of translating the Quran to Urdu. He devoted three years to this task. Assisted by four hired Maulvis, he completely absorbed himself in this task. He translated it into idiomatic Urdu, to enable Urdu speaking people to understand the content better. He also included parenthetical phrases in the translation to make the meaning of the text more clear. This translation brought more fame to Ahmad than any of his earlier publications.

Towards the later part of his stay in the city, Ahmad ceased to write fiction and got more involved in Sir Syed's political activities. In these political campaigns he explored his gift at oratory. He made his first public speech at the annual meeting of Tibbia College in Delhi. This is probably when he realized that ‘his tongue could wield a greater influence than his pen’, in stirring the masses. The demand of his eloquent speeches made him to travel to Calcutta, Madras and Bombay. Aligarh and Lahore were also his frequent stops. He made the most speeches at the annual meetings of Mohammadan Educational Conferences. The Anjuman-i-Himayat Islam, Lahore invited him for their annual anniversary meetings and his lecture of sideline of the gathering attracted throngs of crowds. With his commendable sense of humor and eloquent recitation of verses, he could hold his audience ‘spell bound for two to three hours in a stretch’.

Last days 
Despite holding a post in the British government, Ahmad still preferred the traditional Indian lifestyle, rather than living life in the more anglicized modern British lifestyle.

List of works

Novels

Translations
Some of the translated titles include:
Tarjuma-i Qur’an, 1896 - Urdu translation of the Quran

References

Indian male novelists
Urdu-language novelists
19th-century Indian educational theorists
Muslim reformers
Delhi University alumni
1836 births
1912 deaths
Muslim writers
People from Bijnor district
19th-century Indian Muslims
20th-century Indian novelists
19th-century Indian novelists
19th-century Indian male writers
20th-century Indian educational theorists
Scholars from Uttar Pradesh
Novelists from Uttar Pradesh
20th-century Indian male writers